The 1936 Dzerzhinets-STZ Stalingrad season was the 1st season in USSR championships.

Squad 

 (captain)

Transfers

In:

Out:

Competitions

Friendlies

VCSPS Cup

For successful performance in the VCSPS Cup (participate in the final) Committee on Physical Culture and Sports included team of Stalingrad Tractor Factory in the number of participants of the autumn championship USSR. So Dzerzhinets-STZ became a professional team.

Soviet Cup

USSR Championship. Group IV

Table

General Statistics

Sources
 
 
 

FC Rotor Volgograd seasons
Dzerzhinets-STZ
1936 in Soviet football